Andrew Stunell is an Australian former representative lightweight rower. He was a two time Australian national champion, won a silver medal at the 1994 World Rowing Championships and a gold medal at the 1994 Commonwealth Rowing Championships.

Club and state rowing
Raised in South Australia, Stunell's senior rowing was from the Torrens Rowing Club.

Stunell first made South Australian state selection in the 1990 youth eight contesting the Noel F Wilkinson Trophy at the Interstate Regatta within the Australian Rowing Championships. From 1992 he rowed in South Australian lightweight fours contesting the Penrith Cup. He was in the three seat of the 1992 four  and the 1993  and 1994  victorious South Australian fours.

International representative rowing
Stunell made his first Australian representative appearance in 1992 in an U23 lightweight four which contested an U23 Trans-Tasman series against New Zealand crews. The Australian lightweight four won all three of their match races.

Stunnell made his Australian senior representative debut in 1994 in the men's lightweight coxless four at the Indianapolis 1994 with his South Australian team-mate James Seppelt, Bruce Hick and Gary Lynagh. They rowed to a silver medal. That same crew contested the 1994 Commonwealth Rowing Championships held in association with the 1994 Commonwealth Games. They won gold at those championships. The following year at the 1995 World Rowing Championships he held his seat in the Australian lightweight coxless four. They finished in tenth place and it was Stunell's last Australian representative appearance.

References

External links 
 

Living people
Australian male rowers
World Rowing Championships medalists for Australia
Year of birth missing (living people)